The Ślęza is a river in Lower Silesia, Poland.

Ślęza or Ślęża may also refer to:
 Ślęza, Lower Silesian Voivodeship, a village in Lower Silesia
 Mount Ślęża, a mountain in the Sudeten Foreland in Lower Silesia
 Ślęża Landscape Park, a protected area around Mount Ślęża